The Consumers' Federation of Australia (CFA) is Australia's umbrella consumer advocacy group.

History
In the early 1960s the Australian Consumers Association unsuccessfully attempted to establish state and territory Branches.  The first state or territory based consumer organisation was Canberra Consumers, established in 1963 by Michael Vernon, Godfrey Linge and Bill Howitt.  By the late 1970s most states and territories had their own consumer group.

It soon became apparent that lack of coordinated action by these consumer lobby groups was obstructing political change.  With the election of Gough Whitlam and the Labor Government in 1972, the Government encouraged the disparate consumer groups to join together and form the Australian Federation of Consumer Organisations (AFCO).

In 1974 after a meeting of 27 consumer groups, led by the Australian Consumers' Association and Canberra Consumers, a constitution was drafted and AFCO was officially founded.  AFCO's foundation membership included Canberra Consumers, the Country Women's Association, the Australian Consumers Association and the Consumer Action Movement.

Policy Priorities
The policy priorities of AFCO reflected the main consumer concerns of the decade.  In the 1970s it was the establishment of product standards, trade practices law, social justice and the effects of inflation on consumers.  In the 1980s the policies of interest for AFCO were product labelling, competition, media ownership and health.  In the 1990s the issues were National Competition Policy, media ownership, environmental issues, product safety, tobacco control, financial services and banking and deregulation.

In 1994, for ease of reference, AFCO was renamed the Consumers' Federation of Australia (CFA).

Defunding
In 1996, John Howard and the Liberal National Party Coalition won power.  One of its first actions with regard to consumer affairs was the complete defunding of CFA.  Prior to the election the CFA had nine full-time staff working for it.  After the defunding decision, the CFA had only one part-time paid staff member.  And after twelve months, the only staff members remaining were voluntary.  CFA continues to operate to this day, but only as a voluntary organisation, making only limited contributions to national debate regarding issues affecting consumer affairs.

References
 A History of the Australian Consumer Movement, Jane Brown, Consumers Federation of Australia, Canberra, 1996
 In the Consumer Interest - A selected history of consumer affairs in Australia 1945 - 2000, Simon Smith, SOCAP, Melbourne 2000,

External links
 Consumers Federation of Australia

Consumer organisations in Australia
Members of Consumers International
Organizations established in 1974
1974 establishments in Australia